NES Ratnam College of Arts, Science, and Commerce is a Mumbai-based college located in Bhandup. Established by the National Education Society, the college schools students from grade 11 and 12 right up to advanced degrees and has research facilities and is affiliated to the University of Mumbai.

History
NES Ratnam College of Arts, Science and Commerce is a college in Bhandup, Mumbai, India, owned and managed by the National Education Society (NES Ratnam). Established on 14 April 1963.

Courses

Junior college (MSBSHSE)
F.Y.J.C (Arts, Science and Commerce)
S.Y.J.C (Arts, Science and Commerce)

UG Courses
Bachelor of Arts
Bachelor of Commerce
Bachelor of Science
Bachelor of Management Studies
Bachelor of Mass Media
Bachelor of Science in Information Technology

Master’s Programme
Physics
Microbiology
Organic Chemistry
Inorganic Chemistry
Biochemistry
Computer Science
Information Technology
Botany
Zoology
Bio-Technology

Master's programme by research
Chemistry
Biochemistry
Microbiology
Botany
Zoology

Doctoral programmes
Zoology

Autonomous Courses
PG Diploma in Counselling
PG Diploma in Special *Education (Autonomous)
PG Diploma in Early Childhood *Education (Autonomous)
PG Diploma in Guidance and Counselling (Autonomous)

Teachers
All the teachers in this institute are well trained.
They guide the students in a proper way for a future careers.

The college has NES INSTITUTE FOR COMPREHENSIVE EDUCATION on its own campus.

References

Universities and colleges in Mumbai
1963 establishments in Maharashtra
Educational institutions established in 1963
Colleges in India